The 1946 South Dakota State Jackrabbits football team was an American football team that represented South Dakota State University in the North Central Conference during the 1946 college football season. In its fifth season under head coach Thurlo McCrady, the team compiled a 3–3–2 record and outscored opponents by a total of 131 to 76.

Schedule

References

South Dakota State
South Dakota State Jackrabbits football seasons
South Dakota State Jackrabbits football